is an English trusts law case, concerning constructive trusts. Sinclair ([insofar] as it relied on or followed Heiron and Lister) was partially overruled in July 2014 by the UK Supreme Court in FHR European Ventures LLP v Cedar Capital Partners LLC.

Facts
Between 1995 and 1999 various investors, including Sinclair Investments (UK) Ltd, paid money to Trading Partners Ltd to carry out trades in goods. Mr Cushnie was the director, transferred the money to another company he owned called Versailles Trade Finance Ltd, which was meant to engage in the factoring business. Instead, Versailles fraudulently used the money partly simply to pay ‘profits’ to traders, but also was stolen by Mr Clough, or circulated around other companies so as to appear that genuine business was taking place. Mr Cushnie sold his shares for £28.69m in 1999. Of this money, £9.19m went to the Versailles group, £1m to Mr Clough, £1.75m to traders, £2.25m loan repayment to NatWest, and £11.47m to RBS, of which £1.49m was an overdraft repayment and £9.98m was repayment of the loan secured on the Kensington property. Versailles was discovered, and it was put into receivership. Trading Partners Ltd had lost money because of Versailles activities, and was also put into liquidation in July 2000.

On behalf of creditors such as Sinclair, Trading Partners Ltd (now run by the liquidator) claimed a proprietary interest in Mr Cushnie’s profits from the sale of shares under a constructive trust. Versailles and the banks argued that they could exercise a bona fide purchaser defence. It also claimed to be entitled to the money that passed from Trading Partners to Versailles and were mixed with Versailles’ money, which could be traced into the banks’ hands.

Cushnie and Clough were sentenced to jail for six years each (Clough reduced to five) and were disqualified from being directors for 15 and 10 years respectively.

Judgment

High Court
Lewison J held that the Court of Appeal decisions in Metropolitan Bank v Heiron  and Lister & Co v Stubbs had not been overruled in England, and still remained binding. As to the nature of the proprietary remedy, he held:

Here, no trust would arise. TPL had no proprietary interest in the proceeds of the sale of the shares, and even if they did, the banks were bona fide purchasers, and the claim could not be asserted against them. However, TPL did have a proprietary claim to money passed to Versailles, that Versailles mixed with its own, and could thus trace it into the sums given by the receivers to the banks.

Court of Appeal
In a unanimous decision, the appeal and cross-appeal were dismissed. Neuberger MR held that the old Court of Appeal authority was binding, and TPL only had a personal claim in equity over the assets.

On appeal, the questions were:

Did T have a proprietary interest in the proceeds from the sale of shares?
Could it claim against the banks, or did they have a 'bona fide purchaser defence?
Was the limit on tracing correct?

In its appeal, TPL argued that Attorney General for Hong Kong v Reid should be followed. Neuberger responded:

TPL had no proprietary claim over the proceeds from the sale of shares. Although the share profits could not have been received without Mr C having had his fiduciary office, the proceeds were not beneficially owned by TPL. The claimant could not get a proprietary interest rather than an equitable account for the money acquired in breach of trust, unless it had already been beneficially the property of the beneficiary, or the trustee acquired it by taking advantage of an opportunity or right that was properly that of the beneficiary. This should be distinguished from property obtained simply by being in the position of a fiduciary. There was a personal claim in equity to the funds. Mr C did not owe trustee like duties in relation to the shares

Even if TPL had a proprietary claim over the proceeds of sale of the shares, the banks had had no notice of it when they received, and so Lewison J was entitled to decide that the banks took free of the claim. The banks had no notice of TPL’s proprietary interest in the mixed fund before the time it was claimed back.

The general rule for tracing is that "If a man mixes trust funds with his own, the whole will be treated as trust property, except so far as he may be able to distinguish what is his own." This should be determined by the court on a balance of probabilities. In this case, the banks and receivers had acted in good faith, even though they might have properly sought legal advice about whether there was a proprietary interest in the mixed fund.

Richards LJ and Hughes LJ concurred.

Significance
Lord Neuberger's analysis divides into three broad categories the situations in which a fiduciary obtains a benefit in breach of fiduciary duty:

where the benefit is or was an asset belonging beneficially to the principal,
where the benefit has been obtained by the fiduciary by taking an advantage of an opportunity which was properly that of the principal, and
all other cases.

While benefits in the first two categories will give rise to a constructive trust, those in the third category will not. However, one should also keep in mind the Supreme Court's decision in FHR European Ventures LLP v Cedar Capital Partners LLC, where bribes or secret commissions accepted by an agent will be held in trust for his principal.Sinclair has been viewed as a controversial decisionespecially in its conclusion that a proprietary interest did not arise, as proprietary rights carry priority in an insolvency, which is of central importance in a pyramid scheme such as that operated by Mr C. It is also argued that it will no longer be as easy to strip a recipient of a bribe or the profits made from it, or to trace it into the hands of third parties. It is at variance with other jurisdictions in the Commonwealth and the United States: the Federal Court of Australia preferred to follow Reid instead, as has the British Columbia Court of Appeal.

It should be borne in mind, however, that Sinclair ([insofar] as it relied on or followed Heiron and Lister) was (partially) overruled in July 2014 by the United Kingdom Supreme Court, in FHR European Ventures LLP v Cedar Capital Partners LLC''.

See also

English trusts law
English land law
English property law

Notes

References

References
 

English trusts case law
Court of Appeal (England and Wales) cases
2011 in British law
2011 in case law